Sar Tang-e Mahmud (also Romanized as Sar Tang-e Maḩmūd; also known as Sar Tang-e Maḩmūdī) is a village in Mashayekh Rural District, Naghan District, Kiar County, Chaharmahal and Bakhtiari Province, Iran. At the 2006 census, its population was 475, in 108 families. The village is populated by Lurs.

References 

Populated places in Kiar County
Luri settlements in Chaharmahal and Bakhtiari Province